Synchitini is a tribe of cylindrical bark beetles in the family Zopheridae. There are about 19 genera and at least 40 described species in Synchitini.

Genera
These 19 genera belong to the tribe Synchitini:

 Acolobicus Sharp, 1894 i c g b
 Bitoma Herbst, 1793 i c g b
 Colobicus Latreille, 1807 i c g b
 Coxelus Dejean, 1821 i c g b
 Denophoelus Stephan, 1989 i c g b
 Endeitoma Sharp, 1894 i c g b
 Eucicones Sharp, 1894 i c g b
 Eudesma LeConte, 1863 i c g b
 Lasconotus Erichson, 1845 i c g b
 Lobogestoria Reitter, 1878 i c g b
 Lyreus Aubé, 1861 i c g b
 Megataphrus Casey, 1890 i c g b
 Microprius Fairmaire, 1868 i c g b
 Monoedus Horn, 1882 i c g b
 Namunaria Reitter, 1882 i c g b
 Paha Dajoz, 1984 i c g b
 Phloeonemus Erichson, 1845 i c g b
 Pseudocorticus Hinton, 1935 i c g b
 Synchita Hellwig, 1792 i c g b

Data sources: i = ITIS, c = Catalogue of Life, g = GBIF, b = Bugguide.net

Fossil genera 

 †Paleoendeitoma Deng et al. 2017 Burmese amber, Myanmar, Cenomanian

References

Further reading

External links

 

Zopheridae